Hansapur (Nepali: हंसपुर) is a municipality in Danusha District in Madhesh Province of Nepal. It was formed in 2016 occupying current 9 sections (wards) from previous 9 VDCs. It occupies an area of 48.71 km2 with a total population of 39,145.

References 

Populated places in Dhanusha District
Nepal municipalities established in 2017
Municipalities in Madhesh Province